The Colombia men's national water polo team is the representative for Colombia in international men's water polo.

The team won the silver medal at the 2018 South American Games.

Results

World Championship
1975 – 16th place

References

Water polo
Men's national water polo teams
National water polo teams in South America
National water polo teams by country
Men's sport in Colombia